Kevin Audette Plank (born August 13, 1972) is an American billionaire businessman and philanthropist. Plank is the founder and executive chairman of Under Armour, a manufacturer of sportswear, footwear and accessories, based in Baltimore, Maryland. As of October 2021, his net worth was estimated at US$1.8 billion.

Early life
Plank, a Roman Catholic, grew up in Kensington, Maryland, a suburb of Washington D.C., the youngest of five brothers born to William and Jayne (née Harper) Plank. His father was a prominent Maryland land developer. His mother is a former mayor of Kensington, who went on to direct the Office of Legislative and Intergovernmental Affairs at the United States Department of State under President Ronald Reagan.

Plank grew up playing youth football with the Maplewood Sports Association; a Maplewood team has appeared in Under Armour commercials. He left the prestigious Georgetown Preparatory School, a Catholic school, due to poor academic performance and behavioral issues, then went on to graduate from another Catholic school, St. John's College High School, in 1990. Afterward, he played football at Fork Union Military Academy for a year, trying to get the attention of NCAA Division I schools. He was not recruited by the top-tier collegiate football programs.

However, he went to University of Maryland, College Park and walked onto the team there. He graduated in 1996 with a bachelor's degree in business administration.

His roommate at Maryland was football player and professional wrestler Darren Drozdov. Following a 1999 in-ring accident which left Drozdov quadriplegic, Plank personally financed his customized wheelchair.

Career
While at University of Maryland, Plank launched Cupid's Valentine, a seasonal business selling roses on Valentine's Day. Cupid's Valentine earned $3,000, which Plank used as seed money for Under Armour. He continued to use the "Cupid" name when he later launched his Cupid's Cup competition.

Under Armour
The idea that led to Under Armour was sparked while playing for the Maryland Terrapins; Plank said he was the "sweatiest guy on the football field". Frustrated by his cotton T-shirts' inability to keep him dry and comfortable, he searched for a material that would wick the sweat from his body. After graduating from Maryland, Plank searched for synthetic materials that would keep athletes dry. Using a mix of his own cash, credit cards, and a Small Business Administration loan, he launched the business. Plank tried several prototypes before deciding on the one he wanted to use.

Plank originally sought to call his new sportswear company Heart, but he could not trademark it. He also attempted to name his company Body Armor, but efforts to trademark that name were also unsuccessful. One day, his brother asked him, "How's that company you're working on … Under Armor?" The name stuck. Plank said he chose the British spelling "armour" because he "thought the phone number 888-4ARMOUR was much more compelling than 888-44ARMOR".

Plank initially ran the business from his grandmother's townhouse in Georgetown. Under Armour's first shirt was the #0037, which Plank sold from his car. He also asked his former teammates to try on the shirts, claiming that his alternative to a cotton T-shirt would enhance their performance on the field. As his friends moved on to play professionally, he would send them T-shirts, requesting that they pass them out to other players in their locker rooms. His first big team sale was to Georgia Tech. In 1996, Plank finished his first year selling shirts with $17,000 in sales.

A turning point for him came late in 1999, when Plank used nearly all of Under Armour's money, and employees agreed to go without pay for a few weeks, so the company could take out a $25,000 advertisement in ESPN The Magazine. The ad resulted in $1 million in direct sales for the following year, and athletes and teams began buying the product. Plank's company reached $1 billion annual revenue for the first time in 2010, and Plank became a billionaire in 2011, when his net worth was estimated at $1.05 billion.

Between 2014 and 2016, Under Armour spent close to $1 billion to acquire makers of activity- and diet-tracking mobile apps. Many long-term employees questioned Plank's strategy and whether the company would produce a return on their investment. Plank spent hours in one-on-one conversations to try to persuade those employees. "It was important", Plank said, "that this not just be my decision.” The strategy was a success, earning the company the world's largest digital health-and-fitness community, with 150 million users. A few years later, some of these acquisitions would be divested by the next CEO.

As CEO, Plank oversaw a company that generated  in annual revenue and employed about 15,800 people as of December 31, 2017.

Plank announced his departure as CEO in October 2019, and was succeeded on January 1, 2020, by Under Armour COO Patrik Frisk.

Plank is a member of the board of trustees for the National Football Foundation.

Sagamore Farm
Plank bought the 630-acre historic Sagamore Farm in Baltimore County, Maryland, in 2007. The property was once owned by Alfred Gwynne Vanderbilt. The farm was the home to stallion Native Dancer, who went 21 for 22 during his racing career from 1952 to 1954. Plank has said he seeks to restore the farm and rejuvenate Maryland's horse racing tradition by raising a Triple Crown winning horse. On November 5, 2010, Sagamore Farms' Shared Account won the $2 million Breeders' Cup Filly & Mare Turf (GI). There are about 100 horses on Sagamore farm, with about 40 actively training as of July 2017.

Plank Industries
Beginning in 2013, Plank's real estate firm, Sagamore Development, was leading a $5.5-billion mixed-use development project in Baltimore's Port Covington area. The company had acquired approximately 235 acres in the area and planned to build a mix of offices, residential areas, retail space, parks, boat launches and more.

Plank also founded the whiskey distillery Sagamore Spirit in 2013. He was initially approached about creating a vineyard, but being a whiskey enthusiast he asked his business partner to research whiskey. The limestone aquifer on Plank's farm produced water fit to distill whiskey, so Plank and business partner Bill McDermond founded Sagamore Spirit to restore Maryland's whiskey distilling tradition. Its first bottles were sold at stores in 2016.

Plank renovated the former Recreation Pier building in Fells Point, Baltimore. The building was originally built in 1914 to store port cargo and later served as a community center and studio for the television series Homicide: Life on the Street; it closed in 1999. Following Plank's renovation, the building reopened as the Sagamore Pendry Hotel.

Plank Industries also bought and revamped the water taxi in Inner Harbor.

Philanthropy

Baltimore
Plank donated $1 million through The Cupid Foundation to the Baltimore-based CollegeBound in 2016. The next year, his charitable arm funded 40 summer jobs for Cherry Hill, Baltimore, public school students in the maritime transport industry.

Plank is also active within the Baltimore and Washington, D.C., communities, as a member of the Greater Baltimore Committee and Greater Washington Partnership. He is also a member of the Board of Trustees for Living Classrooms, a Baltimore-Washington based non-profit organization dedicated to the hands-on education of young people using urban, natural and maritime environments as “living classrooms". Through his Cupid Foundation, Plank donated $5 million to help create the UA House at Fayette, an East Baltimore community center run by Living Classrooms.

Entrepreneurship
Plank has been a long-time supporter of the University of Maryland's Robert H. Smith School of Business and Dingman Center for Entrepreneurship. In addition to sitting on the University's Board of Trustees, he played an integral role in the development of an endowment fund that the Dingman Center uses to invest in viable startup businesses. He is also responsible for the development of the Cupid's Cup business competition. The competition got its name from his “Cupid's Valentine” rose business he began while attending the University.

School giving
In November 2014, Plank pledged $25 million to the University of Maryland to be used for the proposed athletics and academic complex. The project has converted Cole Field House, the school's former basketball arena, into the football facility, a sports medicine center and student entrepreneurship lab. In 2015, Plank pledged $16 million to St. John's College High School in Washington, DC, to fund athletics, academics and entrepreneurship initiatives. Plank donated $1 million to the Archdiocese of Baltimore in 2016 to help 100 more children go to Catholic school.

Personal life
Plank married Desiree Guerzon, in 2003. They have two children, and live in Lutherville, Maryland.

Before living in Lutherville, he lived in the Georgetown section of Washington, DC.  His former home, when he put it up for sale, was the most expensive home on the market in Washington, DC.

Politics
According to the Federal Election Commission, Plank has donated to both major U.S. political parties and to individuals of both parties. On CNBC's Halftime Report in February 2017, Plank commented on Donald Trump's pro-business philosophy, saying the president was a "real asset" to the business community. Plank's comments drew criticism on social media. As some customers vowed to boycott the brand, three major endorsers—Stephen Curry, ballerina Misty Copeland, and actor Dwayne "The Rock" Johnson—went on Twitter to express their opposition. Johnson called Plank's words "divisive". In the days following the remarks, Plank bought a full-page advertisement in The Baltimore Sun to clarify his comments. In the ad, Plank said Under Armour stood for job creation, but publicly opposed the president's proposed travel ban.

Plank sat on the President Trump's American Manufacturing Council. He stepped down from the council following President Trump's comments on violence in Charlottesville, Virginia, saying Under Armour "engages in innovation and sports, not politics". Additionally, he publicly opposed President Trump's decision to withdraw from the Paris Accord and was among the Fortune 500 CEOs to sign a pledge to promote workplace diversity and inclusion.

Recognition

2017

Achiever of the Year by Success Magazine
Most Creative People in Business by Fast Company
Sporting Goods Industry Hall of Famer

2016
No. 16 on 50 Most Influential People in Sports Business by Sports Business Journal
No. 37 on Businessperson of the Year list by Fortune
Game Changer by Men's Fitness
No. 26 on Power 100 Most Influential Designers, Influencers and Leaders in the Shoe Industry by Footwear News
No. 6 on 50 Most Influential People in Sports by Sporting News
No. 63 on Power List by Adweek
Hall of Champions award by the U.S. Small Business Administration

2015
No. 23 on 50 Most Influential People in Sports by Sports Business Journal
No. 36 on Businessperson of the Year by Fortune
No. 66 on The Power List by Adweek

2014
Person of the Year by Footwear News
No. 21 on 50 Most Influential People in Sports Business by Sports Business Journal
No. 15 on Top People in Business by Fortune

2013
No. 4 on America's 20 Most Powerful CEOs 40 and Under
No. 24 on Sports Illustrateds Most Powerful People in Sports

References

External links

Living people
1972 births
21st-century American businesspeople
American billionaires
American chief executives of fashion industry companies
American chief executives of manufacturing companies
American company founders
American philanthropists
American sports businesspeople
Businesspeople from Maryland
Maryland Republicans
Maryland Terrapins football players
People from Kensington, Maryland
People from Lutherville, Maryland
Players of American football from Maryland
University of Maryland, College Park alumni
Catholics from Maryland
People from Georgetown (Washington, D.C.)